There are two Vingtaines du Nord in Jersey

 Vingtaine du Nord (St John) in the parish of St John
 Vingtaine du Nord (St Mary) in the parish of St Mary